The former vicarage  is a Grade 2 listed building opposite St. David's Church in Blaenau Ffestiniog, Gwynedd.
It is set behind spear head railings and build to serve the St Davids church. The building was extended in the late 19th century.

The listing mentions that the property (number 16851; reference 44/H/13(2)) is "On the street line opposite St. David's Church and stepped-up from and adjoining Craigbach 3; set behind contemporary spearheaded railings."

References

Grade II listed buildings in Gwynedd
Houses in Gwynedd
Grade II listed houses in Wales
Clergy houses in Wales
Blaenau Ffestiniog